Otia is a rural unincorporated community in Monroe County, Kentucky, United States. The community is located near the confluence of Sulphur Creek and the Cumberland River.

References

Unincorporated communities in Monroe County, Kentucky
Unincorporated communities in Kentucky